The Honduran Cup was the top knock-out football tournament in Honduras.
The first tournament was played in 1968, four years later the second tournament took the name Copa Presidente in honor of Dr. Ramón Cruz; later, General Oswaldo López changed the name and called it Copa Jefe de Estado.  Twenty years later the third tournament was played.  From 1992 to 1994, the Cup tournament was played as a separate tournament from the league (played from June to August).  From 1995 to 1999, the winner of the first stage of the league tournament was declared Cup champions.  In 2015, the tournament was yet again re-launched and re-branded as Copa Presidente.  Since 2015, the Honduran Cup serves as a qualifier to the Supercopa Centroamericana.

Re-launch
In May 2013, the National League and the Liga de Ascenso proposed to reactive the tournament in the near future.  The new Cup would consist of 64 clubs from the first, second and third division. The tournament hasn't been played since 1998.  The new cup will run for an entire year starting 2015.  Beginning in the 2015–16 edition, the tournament will run from August to May.

Champions

Titles by club

See also
 Honduran Liga Nacional
 Honduran Supercup

External links
 Official website

References

 
Honduras
Cup